Duško Savanović (born September 5, 1983) is a Serbian former professional basketball player. A  power forward, he represented the Serbian national basketball team internationally and was an All-Euroleague Second Team selection in 2011.

Professional career

Early years
In his first three years of the professional career, Savanović played for domestic clubs, two seasons with the FMP and one season with the Borac Čačak, both participants of the YUBA League. He helped FMP to win the Adriatic League title in 2006, the second in the club's history.

UNICS Kazan
In October 2006, after almost ten years of playing with the FMP (including his youth career), he signed a two-year contract with the Russian basketball team UNICS Kazan. UNICS also participated in the ULEB Cup. In his second season in the club, he played 15 games in the ULEB Cup and averaged 11.2 points and 3.9 rebounds per game helping his team to reach the Final Eight, while in the Russian League he averaged 11 points and 4.7 rebounds over 22 games.

Cajasol
On 27 June 2008, Savanović signed with the Spanish basketball team Cajasol. In the 2008-09 season, he averaged 14.7 points on 41% three-point shooting and 4.8 rebounds in 36 games in the ACB League. He led Cajasol to its best season of the decade, reaching the Spanish King's Cup final eight and the ACB League playoffs for the first time since 2000.

Valencia BC
After two seasons of playing for Cajasol, on 14 June 2010, Savanović signed with another Spanish team Valencia Power Electronics. Power Electronics was Savanović's first Euroleague club. In his first season in the Euroleague he averaged 11.9 points and 4.6 rebounds in 21 games at the European elite competition. He was named All-Euroleague Second Team at the end of the season.

Anadolu Efes
On 20 June 2011, after one season with the Valencia, Savanović signed a three-year contract with Turkish team Anadolu Efes. In 16 games (8 as starter) in the Euroleague, he averaged 10 points and 5.6 rebounds per game, while in the regular season of the Turkish Basketball League he averaged 12.6 points and 5.4 rebounds per game.

Bayern Munich
On July 18, 2014, he signed a two-year deal with the German team Bayern Munich.

Dinamo Sassari
On June 4, 2016, Savanović signed with Dinamo Sassari for the 2016–17 season. After the end of the season, in May 2017, his agent confirmed that he has retired from professional basketball.

Serbian national team

Savanović has been a member of the Serbian national team at the 2010 FIBA World Championship where Serbia was defeated 99-88 by Lithuania in the game for the bronze medal. He was capped for the national team of Serbia at the EuroBasket 2011 in Lithuania where Serbia finished 8th. He averaged 13.4 points and 3.6 rebounds per game.

Career statistics

Euroleague

|-
| style="text-align:left;"| 2010–11
| style="text-align:left;"| Valencia
| 21 || 13 || 25.4 || .450 || .365 || .851 || 4.6 || 1.0 || .8 || .4 || 11.9 || 12.0
|-
| style="text-align:left;"| 2011–12
| style="text-align:left;" rowspan="3"| Anadolu Efes
| 16 || 8 || 27.1 || .371 || .345 || .824 || 5.6 || 1.1 || .8 || .4 || 10.0 || 11.8
|-
| style="text-align:left;"| 2012–13
| 29 || 25 || 22.7 || .416 || .320 || .814 || 3.7 || 1.0 || 1.0 || .1 || 9.4 || 9.8
|-
| style="text-align:left;"| 2013–14
| 23 || 19 || 26.1 || .411 || .344 || .694 || 3.7 || 2.2 || .7 || .3 || 10.5 || 10.2
|-
| style="text-align:left;"| 2014–15
| style="text-align:left;" rowspan="2"| Bayern
| 10 || 6 || 25.2 || .451 || .462 || .750 || 4.4 || 1.2 || .7 || .2 || 13.1 || 13.2
|-
| style="text-align:left;"| 2015–16
| 9 || 9 || 24.4 || .411 || .300 || .846 || 5.8 || 1.7 || 1.0 || .2 || 11.2 || 11.2
|- class="sortbottom"
| style="text-align:center;" colspan="2"| '''Career
| 108 || 80 || 25.0 || .419 || .351 || .790 || 4.4 || 1.4 || .8 || .3 || 10.7 || 11.0

See also 
 List of Serbia men's national basketball team players

References

External links

 Duško Savanović at acb.com 
 Duško Savanović at beko-bbl.de 
 Duško Savanović at euroleague.net
 Duško Savanović at fiba.com
 Duško Savanović at legabasket.it 
 Duško Savanović at tblstat.net

1983 births
Living people
ABA League players
Anadolu Efes S.K. players
BC UNICS players
Real Betis Baloncesto players
Dinamo Sassari players
FC Bayern Munich basketball players
KK Borac Čačak players
KK FMP (1991–2011) players
Lega Basket Serie A players
Liga ACB players
Power forwards (basketball)
Serbia men's national basketball team players
Serbian men's basketball players
Serbian expatriate basketball people in Germany
Serbian expatriate basketball people in Italy
Serbian expatriate basketball people in Russia
Serbian expatriate basketball people in Spain
Serbian expatriate basketball people in Turkey
Serbs of Croatia
Croatian expatriate basketball people in Serbia
Basketball players from Zagreb
Valencia Basket players
2010 FIBA World Championship players